The Municipal Government Act (informally known as Bill 23) is an act introduced by Edgar Gerhart in the Alberta Legislature in 1968 during the 1st Session of the 16th Alberta Legislature. It came into effect on June 1, 1968, and defines the laws and rules under which municipalities may operate.

History 
In March 2022, Bill 4 of the 3rd Session of the 30th Alberta Legislature, known as the Municipal Government (Face Mask and Proof of COVID-19 Vaccination Bylaws) Amendment Act, 2022 was introduced which amends the Municipal Government Act in order to restrict the introduction and enactment of municipal bylaws regarding face masks and proof of vaccination against COVID-19 unless approved by the Minister of Municipal Affairs, and required the immediate repeal of such municipal bylaws already in place upon coming into force. It passed first, second, and third readings throughout the month and received Royal Assent on April 21, 2022 and became law on the same day.

References

External links 
 Municipal Government Act (PDF)

Alberta provincial legislation
1968 in Canada
1968 in Alberta